The Northeast Conference men's basketball tournament is the conference championship tournament in basketball for the Northeast Conference (NEC). It has been held every year since the NEC was established in the 1981–82 season. The tournament is an eight-team single-elimination tournament and seeding is based on regular season records. The bracket is reseeded after the quarterfinals, with the highest remaining seed playing the lowest remaining seed in the semifinals. The tournament winner receives the conference's automatic bid to the NCAA basketball tournament.

Robert Morris, which left the NEC in 2020 for the Horizon League, is the program that has won the most NEC Tournament Championships (9), followed by current NEC members LIU (6) and Fairleigh Dickinson (6) as well as Mount St. Mary's (also 6), which left the NEC in 2022 for the Metro Atlantic Athletic Conference. LIU, which before 2019–20 represented only the university's Brooklyn campus, has been the only program to win three consecutive tournament championships, from 2011–2013. Robert Morris won back-to-back championships on three occasions (1982–83, 1989–90 and 2009–10), the only other programs to win back-to-back championships, Marist and Rider, are also no longer members of the NEC. Of the current conference members (9 programs), four have not won a championship. St. Francis Brooklyn and Sacred Heart have participated in all NEC tournaments since both joined the conference; Merrimack and Stonehill have yet to participate.

Through the 2022 tournament, schools transitioning from NCAA Division II were ineligible for the conference tournament, paralleling NCAA policy that prohibits such schools from NCAA-sponsored postseason play (either the NCAA tournament or the NIT). After the 2021–22 season, the NEC presidents voted to allow transitional members to participate in the NEC tournament starting with the third season of their four-year transition. Merrimack, which joined the NEC in 2019–20, will be eligible for the 2023 tournament, its last before completing its D-I transition. Stonehill, a 2022–23 arrival, becomes eligible for the tournament in 2025. Should a transitional program win the conference tournament, the automatic NCAA tournament bid will go to the other finalist.

History of the Tournament Final

Winners and finals appearances by school

Notes

Broadcasters

Television

Radio

See also
 Northeast Conference women's basketball tournament

References

 
Recurring sporting events established in 1982